Irina Victorovna Apeksimova (born January 13, 1966, Volgograd, RSFSR, USSR) is a Russian stage and screen actress. She became director of the Taganka Theatre in March 2015.

Biography
Apeksimova was the child of classical musicians, Victor Nikolaevich Apeksimov and Svetlana Yakolevna. Irina was the second child in the family; her older brother Valery later became a jazz composer and pianist in the United States.

Apeksimova's parents divorced when she was in the eighth grade, and she moved with her mother to Odessa, where she studied acting. After high school Apeksimova went to Moscow to enter the Moscow Art Theater School, but was rejected because of her Odessa accent. Back in Odessa, she joined the Odessa Opera Theater and danced for a year in the corps de ballet. She then applied again to the Moscow Art Theater School but was again rejected. After this setback, Irina returned to Volgograd and joined the Theater of Musical Comedy, in the corps de ballet.

After living in Volgograd for a year, Apeksimova had shed much of her Odessa accent, and applied for a third time to the Moscow Art Theater School. She was accepted and admitted in 1986 into Oleg Tabakov's class. Apeksimova graduated in 1990 and joined the studio at the Moscow Art Theatre, where she stayed until 2000. In 1994, she won the Best Actress Award at the Paris Film Festival for her role in the film October (Октябрь).

Credits

Theatrical roles
Skylark (Жаворонок). Director: Oleg Tabakov. Role: Agnes.
Crazy Jourdain (Полоумный Журден). Director: Oleg Tabakov. Role: Dorimena
Zatovarennaya's Barrels (Затоваренная бочкотара). Director: Eugene Kamenkovich.
Armchair (Кресло).
The Taming of the Shrew. Director: Brian Cox. Role: Katherina.
Richard III. Director: Brian Cox. Role: Lady M.
Uncle Vanya (Дядя Ваня). Director: Oleg Efremov. Role: Helena.
Boris Godunov (Борис Годунов). Director: Oleg Efremov. Role: Marina Mniszech.
Woe from Wit (Горе от ума). Director: Oleg Efremov. Role: Sofia.
Hoffman (Гоффман). Director: Nikolai Skorik. Role: Julia.
Masquerade (Маскарад). Director: Roman Kozak. Role: Baroness Shtral.
Beautiful Life (Красивая жизнь). Director: Lanskoy.
Tragedians and Comedians (Трагики и комедианты). Director: Nikolai Skorik. Role: Lisa.
The Milk Train Doesn't Stop Here Anymore. Director: Dolgachev. Role: Blackie.
Little Tragedies (Маленькие трагедии). Director: Roman Kozak. Role: Laura.
Thunderstorm (Гроза). Director: Dmitri Brusnikin. Role: crazy lady.
A Midsummer Night's Dream. Director: N. Sheiko. Role: Titania.
Ondine (Ундина). Director: Nikolai Skorik. Role: Countess Bertha
Archaeology (Археология). Director: Kochetkov.
Dancing to the Sound of Rain (Танцы под шум дождя). Director: Nikolai Skorik. Role: muse.
Unexpected Joy (Нечаянная радость). Director: Kolesnikov.
Pearl Zinaida (Перламутровая Зинаида). Director: Oleg Efremov. Role: a foreigner.
Blessed Island (Блаженный остров). Director: N. Sheiko.
The Most Important Thing (Самое главное). Director: Roman Kozak.
Seylemskie Witch (Сейлемские колдуньи). Director: Brian Cox.

Private Company roles
Dangerous Liaisons. Director: Sergei Vinogradov. Role: Marquise.
www.london.ru. Director: Stein.
Dinner with a Fool (Ужин с дураком). Director: V. Trushkin. Role: Marlene.
The Cherry Orchard (Вишнёвый сад). Director: E. Nekrosius. Role: Charlotte.

Film roles
In addition to her many roles in Russian films, Apeksimova played in the 1997 Hollywood Val Kilmer vehicle The Saint. She starred in the 1999 film The Book of Masters, the first Russian film by an arm of The Walt Disney Company (the CIS division).

1992 Melochi zhizni (TV)
1995 What a Mess!
1997 The Saint
2000 Empire under Attack
2003 Red Serpent
2005 Yesenin (TV)
2007  Against all Better Judgement 
2009 The Book of Masters

References

External links

Brief biography at Film-Theater 
Brief biography at Ruskino 

Living people
1966 births
Actors from Volgograd
Russian film actresses
Russian television actresses
Russian stage actresses
20th-century Russian actresses
21st-century Russian actresses
Russian ballerinas
Russian television presenters
Honored Artists of the Russian Federation
Russian women television presenters
Moscow Art Theatre School alumni